The 2015 Tanzania road accident occurred on 11 March 2015 when a bus and two lorries collided in Tanzania. At least 41 people died and another 23 were wounded. The crash took place in Iringa Region.

See also
List of road accidents (2010–present)

References

Tanzania road accident
Road accident
Iringa Region